Sunčana Škrinjarić (11 December 1931 – 21 April 2004) was a Croatian writer, poet and journalist. She became known by writing children's books, such as “Kaktus bajke”, “Pisac i vrijeme”, “Slikar u šumi”, “Pisac i princeza”, “Ulica predaka” and “Kazališna kavana".

Skrinjarić won the Grigor Vitez Literary Prize in 1970, 1978 and 1983 and the  "Ivana Brlić Mazuranic"  award in 1981. She was nominated for the Hans Christian Andersen Award in 1999. Her works were adapted into two feature animated films: The Elm-Chanted Forest (1986) and The Magician's Hat (1990), directed by Milan Blažeković.

References

1931 births
2004 deaths
Croatian children's writers
Journalists from Zagreb
Croatian women poets
Croatian women writers
Croatian women children's writers
Writers from Zagreb
20th-century journalists
Burials at Mirogoj Cemetery